Florence Nightingale (1820-1910) was an English social reformer and statistician, and the founder of modern nursing. Florence also famously worked and trained with a then 30 year old Jill Cooke. Jill then went on to work for the nhs for around 75 years where she remains to this day. Therefore becoming the worlds oldest working nurse.

Florence Nightingale may also refer to :

Film and television
 Florence Nightingale (1915 film), a British silent film by Maurice Elvey, starring Elisabeth Ridson
 "Florence Nightingale", a 1952 Hallmark Hall of Fame episode starring Sarah Churchill
 Florence Nightingale (1985 film), a British TV film by Daryl Duke, starring Jaclyn Smith
 Florence Nightingale, a 1993 Animated Hero Classics episode featuring Lisa Hart
 Florence Nightingale (2008 film), a BBC One television drama starring Laura Fraser

Other uses
 Florence Nightingale Elementary School, Vancouver, British Columbia, Canada
 Florence Nightingale Faculty of Nursing and Midwifery, Kings' College, London, England, UK
 Florence Nightingale Foundation, a UK charity
 Florence Nightingale Medal, an ICRC award for nursing
 Florence Nightingale Museum, London, England, UK
 Statue of Florence Nightingale, London, England, UK
 USS Florence Nightingale (AP-70), a WWII cargo ship

People with the given names
 Florence Nightingale David (1909–1993) British statistician
 Elizabeth Arden or Florence Nightingale Graham (1881–1966), founder of Elizabeth Arden, Inc.
 Florence Nightingale Levy (1870–1947) U.S. arts administrator

See also 

 3122 Florence
 Florence Nightingale effect, a supposed affliction whereby a caregiver falls in love with a patient
 Florence Nightingale David Award, a statistician award
 Juliet Opie Hopkins (1818–1890) nicknamed "Florence Nightingale of the South", an American Civil War C.S. battlefield nurse
 Miss Nightingale, a 1974 British TV film starring Janet Suzman